Velder is a surname. Notable people with the surname include:

Anthony Velder (born 1992), Dutch footballer
Eli Velder (1925–2020), American academic
, Dutch footballer
 (born 1958), Dutch entrepreneur
Nygel Velder (born 1992), Dutch footballer
 (born 1939), Canadian sculptor and painter